The National & Provincial Building Society was a mutual building society based in Bradford, England. It was established in 1982 by a merger between the Provincial Building Society and the Burnley Building Society.

On 5 August 1996, Abbey National took over the National & Provincial.

References

Former building societies of the United Kingdom
Banks established in 1982
Organizations established in 1982
Banks disestablished in 1996
Organizations disestablished in 1996
1982 establishments in England
1996 disestablishments in England